Lithium cyanide is an inorganic compound with the chemical formula LiCN. It is a toxic, white colored, hygroscopic, water-soluble salt that finds only niche uses.

Preparation
LiCN arises from the interaction of lithium hydroxide and hydrogen cyanide.  A laboratory-scale preparation uses acetone cyanohydrin as a surrogate for HCN:
(CH3)2C(OH)CN  +  LiH   →  (CH3)2CO  +  LiCN  +  H2

Uses
The compound decomposes to cyanamide and carbon when heated to a temperature close to but below 600 °C. Acids react to give hydrogen cyanide.

Lithium cyanide can be used as a reagent for organic compound cyanation.
RX  +  LiCN  →   RCN  +  LiX

References

Lithium salts
Cyanides